Recorder of deeds or deeds registry (officially: Real Estate Registration and Documentation Authority) is a government office tasked with maintaining public records and documents, especially records relating to real estate ownership that provide persons other than the owner of a property with real rights over that property.

Background
The offices with similar duties (varying by jurisdiction) include registrar general, register of deeds, registrar of deeds, registrar of titles. The office of such an official may be referred to as the deeds registry or deeds office. In the United States, the recorder of deeds is often an elected county office and is called the county recorder. In some U.S. states, the functions of a recorder of deeds are a responsibility of the county clerk (or the county's clerk of court), and the official may be called a clerk-recorder or recorder-clerk.

The recorder of deeds provides a single location in which records of real property rights are recorded and may be researched by interested parties. The record of deeds often maintains documents regularly recorded by the recorder of deeds, including deeds, mortgages, mechanic's liens, releases and plats, among others. To allow full access to deeds recorded throughout the office history, several indexes may be maintained, which include grantor–grantee indexes, tract indexes, and plat maps. Storage methods to record registry entries include paper, microform, and computer.

The principles of statutory, case, and common law are given effect by the recorder of deeds, insofar as it relates to vested ownership in land and other real rights. Because estate in land can be held in so many complex ways, a single deeds registry provides some clarity, even though it cannot "guarantee" those real property rights.

The legal certainty provided by a title deed issued under the registration of the recorder of deeds is of great significance to all parties who hold, or wish to acquire rights in real property. Certainty of title is the basis for the investment of massive amounts of money in real estate development for residential, commercial, industrial and agricultural use each year. This is why the meticulous recording of registration information by the recorder of deeds is so important.

Each document recorded against title to real estate can be examined and the portion of the bundle of rights that it includes can be determined. These records can assist interested parties in researching the history of land and the chain of title for any property and purpose.

Philippines: Registry of Deeds
The Registry of Deeds exists in almost all cities and municipalities in the Philippines and it has a primary duty of registering and keeping all documents pertaining to transfer of real property and issuance of certificates of land title, whether original, transfer or condominium as well as chattel mortgage papers. The said agency is under the supervision of the Land Registration Authority, Department of Justice.

South Africa: Deeds Registry
The South African system of deeds registry is unique in that it is associated with tenure security. When conveyancers transfer title, they are expected to follow rigid procedures which involve ensuring the title and the property comply with all the relevant legislation and regulations, leading to a high degree of certainty and accuracy. Recent concerns about the standard of legal education in South Africa, however, has raised concerns about whether this is still the case. The South African Registrar of Deeds is responsible for the national system of deeds offices which, through a juristic foundation and long-standing practices and procedures, has the effect of “guaranteeing” title.

The Deeds Registries Act and Sectional Titles Act are applied to regulate the deeds registry system, and form the foundation of land registration in South Africa.

United States: Recorders of Deeds
In the U.S., most recorders of deeds are elected officials who serve the area of a county or equivalent jurisdiction.

In some states, the recorder of deeds may also act as a public posting place for documents that are not directly related to estates in land, such as corporate charters, military discharges, Uniform Commercial Code records, applications for marriage licenses, and judgments.

Deeds in a few states of the U.S. are maintained under the Torrens title system or some limited implementation of it. (For example: Minnesota, some property in Massachusetts, Colorado, Hawaii, New York, North Carolina, Ohio, and Washington.)

Other U.S. states maintain their deeds under common law; typically, they are filed in chronological order with a grantor/grantee index.

Recorders/registers of deeds who became prominent in politics

District of Columbia 
Simon Wolf: Recorder of Deeds for the District of Columbia, 1869–1878
George A. Sheridan: Recorder for the District of Columbia, 1878
Frederick Douglass: Recorder of Deeds for the District of Columbia, May, 1881 – August, 1886
James Campbell Matthews: Recorder of Deeds for the District of Columbia, August 1886 – March, 1887
James M. Trotter: Recorder of Deeds for the District of Columbia, March, 1887 – February 1890
Blanche Kelso Bruce: Recorder of Deeds for the District of Columbia, 1891–93
C. H. J. Taylor: Recorder of Deeds for the District of Columbia, 1894–1896
Henry Plummer Cheatham: Recorder of Deeds for the District of Columbia, 1897–1901
John C. Dancy: Recorder of Deeds for the District of Columbia, 1901–1910
Henry Lincoln Johnson: Recorder of Deeds for the District of Columbia, 1910
John F. Costello: Recorder of Deeds for the District of Columbia, 1916
Arthur G. Froe: Recorder of Deeds for the District of Columbia, 1922
Jefferson S. Coage: Recorder of Deeds for the District of Columbia, 1930
William J. Thompkins: Recorder of Deeds for the District of Columbia, March 1934 – 1944
Marshall L. Shepard: Recorder of Deeds for the District of Columbia, 1944 – 1951

Elsewhere in the US
Joseph Montgomery: Recorder of Deeds and Register of Wills, Dauphin County, Pennsylvania, 1785–94
Samuel P. Morrill: Register of Deeds for Franklin County, Maine, 1857–67
Hugh McLaughlin (politician), Register of Deeds for Kings County, New York, for three consecutive terms from 1861
Charles E. Townsend: Register of Deeds for Jackson County, Michigan, 1886–97
William S. Vare: Recorder of Deeds for Philadelphia, Pennsylvania, 1902–12
Edward Boland: Register of Deeds for Hampden County, Massachusetts, 1941–52
Carol Moseley Braun: Recorder of Deeds for Cook County, Illinois, 1988–92
Jesse White: Recorder of Deeds for Cook County, Illinois, 1993–99
Ryan Costello: Recorder of Deeds for Chester County, Pennsylvania, 2008–11
Zach Payne: Recorder of Deeds for Clark County, Indiana, 2015–18

Spain
Mariano Rajoy: Recorder of Deeds first for Padrón, then for Villafranca del Bierzo, and lately for Santa Pola, Spain; from 1979 until the present

See also
Cadastre
Crown lands
Land registration
Property law
Recorder (judge)
Registry of Deeds (Massachusetts)
Torrens title

References

External links

Recording process:
Illinois Mechanics Liens
Landaccess Records Search for Illinois, Michigan, Missouri, New Jersey, New York, Ohio, Pennsylvania and South Carolina

Directory:
 Recorders of Deeds by State
 National County Recorders Directory
 Recorders of Deeds by State & County

Organizations:
Property Records Industry Association (PRIA)
Kansas Register of Deeds Association
North Carolina Association of Registers of Deeds
Wisconsin Register of Deeds Association
Ohio Recorders' Association, OH

Specific offices:
Cook County, IL
Columbus County, NC
Guilford County, NC
Hall County, NE
Anderson County, TN (first with online document viewing, 3/24/97)
Shelby County, TN
Wilson County, TN
Johnston County, NC  (first electronic recording of a land record via eNotary under the newly approved North Carolina ERC rules)
Delaware County, OH

Commercial Online Providers:
Tapestry
USLandRecords Real Property Official Records Search
TitleSearcher.com

Software and Service Providers:
Fidlar Technologies
ArcaSearch - Digitization of Historic Documents and Records

South Africa:
DeedsWeb is the Department of Land Affairs' official website for the supply of deeds registration information.
This report gives an overview of the foundations, performance, and goals of Deeds Registration in South Africa.

Ukraine:
All land and houses Records are at Ministry of Justice of Ukraine

County officers in the United States
Government occupations
Legal professions
Local government in the United States
Land registration